Hassan Hanini (born 21 October 1958) is a Moroccan footballer. He competed in the men's tournament at the 1984 Summer Olympics.

References

External links
 

1958 births
Living people
Moroccan footballers
Morocco international footballers
Olympic footballers of Morocco
Footballers at the 1984 Summer Olympics
Association football forwards